Major General B.B. Susantha Mendis, USP  (1951 – 11 September 1998) was a senior Sri Lanka Army officer, who was the former Commanding Officer of 51-2 Brigade based in Jaffna.

Early life and education
Mendis was educated at St Sylvester's College, Kandy.

Military career
He joined the Sri Lanka Army as an officer cadet and received his basic officer training at the Army Training Centre, Diyatalawa. He was commissioned as a Second Lieutenant in the Sinha Regiment. During his career he held many positions within the army including that of Commanding Officer, 1st Battalion, Sri Lanka Singh Regiment. Brigadier Mendis was Commanding Officer of 51-2 Brigade attached to the 51 Division.

Death
On 11 September 1998, he attended a meeting at the office of the Mayor of Jaffna to discuss traffic arrangements in the town of Jaffna. The Liberation Tigers of Tamil Eelam (LTTE) detonated a bomb in the office killing 12 persons including Brigadier Mendis, Mayor Pon Sivapalan, SSP Chandra Perera, Captain Ramanayaka, the Brigadier's Principal Staff Officer (PSO) and four police officers. Also killed were S Pathamanathan, Commissioner for Rehabilitation of the Jaffna Municipality and Architect Mallika Rajaratnam. Brigadier Mendis was posthumously promoted to the rank of Major General.

External links 
Official Website of Sri Lanka Army
Ministry of Defence, Sri Lanka
MIC-Military Intelligence Corps

References 

 THE DRIFT IN JAFFNA: THE URGENCY OF A POLITICAL SETTLEMENT & THE IMPORTANCE OF LARRY WIJERATNE'S LEGACY., THE UNIVERSITY TEACHERS FOR HUMAN RIGHTS, JAFFNA (UTHR(Jaffna)) Sri Lanka
 Patterns of Global Terrorism: 1998 Asia Overview
 Tigers send a deadly message, By Sudha Ramachandran

The Larry Wijeratne That I Knew

1950 births
1998 deaths
Sri Lankan major generals
Sinhalese military personnel
Assassinated military personnel
Assassinated Sri Lankan people
Terrorist incidents in Sri Lanka in 1998
Suicide bombings in Sri Lanka
Sri Lanka Military Academy graduates
People killed during the Sri Lankan Civil War